The 1988 Tour of the Basque Country was the 28th edition of the Tour of the Basque Country cycle race and was held from 4 April to 8 April 1988. The race started in Beasain and finished in Otzaurte. The race was won by Erik Breukink of the Panasonic team.

General classification

References

1988
Bas